Sarpy may refer to:

Places
New Sarpy, Louisiana
Sarpy County, Nebraska

People
Peter A. Sarpy (1804-1865), American pioneer businessman

See also
Sarpi (disambiguation)

nl:Sarpi